Colby A. Howard (born October 28, 2001) is an American professional stock car racing driver. He competes full-time in the NASCAR Craftsman Truck Series, driving the No. 9 Chevrolet Silverado for CR7 Motorsports.

Racing career

Howard started racing at six years old, racing dirt bikes. He raced bikes for six years until a broken leg and collarbone ended his career. After that, Howard raced Bandoleros and late models before moving to full-bodied stock cars.

In November 2019, he joined Young's Motorsports for the final two races of the 2019 NASCAR Gander Outdoors Truck Series season starting with the Lucas Oil 150 at ISM Raceway.

On January 9, 2020, it was announced that Howard would join JD Motorsports for 20 races in the 2020 NASCAR Xfinity Series season. When Howard was choosing his team for 2020, he had a few offers to run full-time in the NASCAR Gander RV & Outdoors Truck Series, but chose the part-time Xfinity ride with JDM in an effort to get to the NASCAR Cup Series faster.

For 2021, Howard remained in the No. 15 for JD Motorsports with returning primary sponsorship from the Project Hope Foundation but ran the full season. Also, Wayne Carroll Jr. moved from the No. 6 JDM car to crew chief Howard in the No. 15 in 2021, replacing Mark Setzer, who left the team to be the crew chief for the No. 51 of Jeremy Clements and his team. Setzer crew chiefed Howard in all his starts in 2020 except for Talladega in October 2020, when Carroll was his crew chief instead.

For 2022, Howard left the Xfinity Series to compete full time for McAnally-Hilgemann Racing in the NASCAR Camping World Truck Series.

On February 7, 2023, it was announced that Howard would drive the No. 9 truck full-time for CR7 Motorsports in the Truck Series in 2023. He drove the same truck part-time in 2021.

Personal life
Howard is a third-generation racing driver; his grandfather earned track championships at Greenville-Pickens Speedway and his father Rodney Howard is a former NASCAR Busch Series driver.

Motorsports career results

NASCAR
(key) (Bold – Pole position awarded by qualifying time. Italics – Pole position earned by points standings or practice time. * – Most laps led.)

Xfinity Series

Craftsman Truck Series

 Season still in progress
 Ineligible for series points

ARCA Menards Series
(key) (Bold – Pole position awarded by qualifying time. Italics – Pole position earned by points standings or practice time. * – Most laps led.)

ARCA Menards Series West

References

External links
 
 

ARCA Menards Series drivers
NASCAR drivers
2001 births
People from Simpsonville, South Carolina
Living people
Racing drivers from South Carolina